William James Vincent Walker (4 August 1886 – 20 April 1949) was an Australian rules footballer who played with University in the Victorian Football League in 1912 and 1913.

A teacher, Walker enlisted in August 1915 and served in the Army Educational Services, rising through the ranks from Private to become a commissioned officer by the end of the war.

References

External links

1886 births
Australian rules footballers from Victoria (Australia)
University Football Club players
Australian military personnel of World War I
1949 deaths
People from Castlemaine, Victoria
Military personnel from Victoria (Australia)